The Canada men’s national rugby sevens team competes at several international tournaments — the World Rugby Sevens Series, Rugby World Cup Sevens, Pan American Games and the Commonwealth Games.

History

Honours
 2011 Pan American Games Gold medal
 2013 Rugby World Cup Sevens Plate Champions
 2013 World Games Bronze medal
 2015 Pan American Games Gold medal
 2017 Singapore Sevens Cup Champions

Current squad

Squad for the 2022 Rugby World Cup Sevens in Cape Town.
Head coach: Henry Paul

World Rugby Sevens Series

The principal competition in which the Canada national rugby sevens team regularly competes is the World Rugby Sevens Series. Canada is one of the core teams that plays in every Series tournament.

Results by season

Third place games/Bronze finals were introduced in the 2011-12 season.  Starting in the 2016-17 season, Silver and Bronze medals were introduced, 5th place replaced the Plate, the Challenge Trophy replace the Bowl, and the 13th place replaced the Shield.
† Due to the impacts of the COVID-19 pandemic, World Rugby revised the method used for the series standings in the interest of fairness to teams not able to participate in all rounds of the 2021–22 season. This system excluded the two lowest-scored rounds from each team in the final standings. So, with nine tournaments in the series, only the best seven tournament results for each team contributed to the ranking points.

Totals

Last updated: 5 January 2023.

Major quadrennial tournaments
Canada competes to participate in two major global quadrennial tournaments — the Summer Olympics and the Rugby World Cup Sevens.

Summer Olympics

Rugby World Cup Sevens

Other tournaments

Commonwealth Games

Pan American Games

World Games

 Rugby sevens was discontinued after the 2013 World Games due to the sport returning to the Olympics in 2016.

Player records
The following shows the Canadian statistical leaders based on World Series play.

See also

 Rugby World Cup Sevens
 Canada national rugby union team

References

National rugby sevens teams
Sevens